Meridian, California may refer to:
 Meridian, Humboldt County, California
 Meridian, Kern County, California
 Meridian, Santa Clara County, California
 Meridian, Sutter County, California

See also
 120th meridian west, the line of longitude defining the Pacific Time Zone (which includes California)